Sugar Camp Hollow is a valley in Stone County in the Ozarks of southwest Missouri.

Sugar Camp Hollow was so named on account of the sugar processing outpost the valley once contained.

References

Valleys of Stone County, Missouri
Valleys of Missouri